James Banks McFadden (February 7, 1917 – June 4, 2005) was an American football and basketball player and coach. McFadden is best known for his association with Clemson University, where he spent 43 years as a player, coach, and administrator. He was elected to the College Football Hall of Fame in 1959.

Early life
Born in Fort Lawn, South Carolina, McFadden attended Great Falls High School in Great Falls, South Carolina, where he led the Red Devils to two state championships in football and one in basketball.

Playing career

McFadden is widely considered to be the greatest athlete in Clemson University history, lettering in three sports (football, basketball, and track). In 1939, McFadden was voted the Associated Press' "Athlete of the Year". McFadden was also a two-time All-American in basketball (1938 and 1939) and led the Tigers basketball team to a Southern Conference championship in 1939. McFadden also played halfback and punter on the football team and was named Clemson's first Associated Press All-American in football in 1939, which saw the Tigers play and win their 1st bowl game (1940 Cotton Bowl Classic).

Upon graduating, McFadden played football for the National Football League's Brooklyn Dodgers. He was the fourth overall pick in the 1940 NFL Draft. In his first and only year as a professional, he played in 11 games. He had the longest rush in the NFL that year—75 yards. He was tied for second for most yards per attempt with a 4.8 yards per carry average. He was also fifth in the league for most rushing yards per game. Defensively he had two interceptions. Despite his success, McFadden preferred the small-town life and the family atmosphere of Clemson.  He returned to the state of South Carolina to coach at his alma mater.

Military and coaching career
McFadden fought in World War II and upon returning to the United States returned to coaching.  McFadden served as Clemson's head basketball coach from 1946-1956 in addition to stints as head track and assistant football coach.  He retired from coaching in 1969 and took over the university's intramural department, which he directed for 15 years.

Legacy

On September 19, 1987, Clemson University retired his basketball No. 23 and football No. 66.

In October 2008, the O'Rourke–McFadden Trophy was introduced as a reward to the winner of the annual football game between Boston College and Clemson, in honor of the historic meeting between Charlie O'Rourke and Banks McFadden in the 1940 Cotton Bowl Classic, Clemson's first bowl appearance.

References

External links

 
 
 

1917 births
2005 deaths
American football halfbacks
American men's basketball players
Brooklyn Dodgers (NFL) players
Clemson Tigers football players
Clemson Tigers men's basketball coaches
Clemson Tigers men's basketball players
Clemson Tigers men's track and field athletes
Clemson Tigers track and field coaches
All-American college men's basketball players
College Football Hall of Fame inductees
Basketball coaches from South Carolina
American military personnel of World War II
People from Chester County, South Carolina
Coaches of American football from South Carolina
Players of American football from South Carolina
Basketball players from South Carolina
Track and field athletes from South Carolina